Louise Kartousch (17 August 1886 – 13 February 1964) was an Austrian character dancer, opera and operetta soprano.

Life 
Born in Linz, Kartousch attended the music school in Linz and was trained in Vienna. She had children's roles in Linz and from 1902 worked as a second soubrette in Graz, where she also appeared in opera (for example as a Walküre). From 1907 to 1921, she performed at the Theater an der Wien in Lehár's, Fall's and Kálmán's operettas. She was described as a "soubrette of race and temperament" and the press highlighted her joy of playing and dancing. Kartousch also performed at the Raimundtheater, the Volksoper Wien and the Theater in der Josefstadt.

Kartousch died in Vienna at the age of 77. Her grave is located at the Hietzing Cemetery.

Operettas 
 Zigeunerliebe
 Herbstmanöver
 Wo die Lerche singt
 Der Graf von Luxemburg
 Die Dollarprinzessin
 Das Land des Lächelns
 
 Madame Pompadour

References

External links 
 
 

Austrian operatic sopranos
Austrian female dancers
1886 births
1964 deaths
Artists from Linz